Fulwood may refer to:

People
Fulwood (surname)

Places
Fulwood, Lancashire, England
Fulwood Urban District, a former local government district
Fulwood railway station in Lancashire, later renamed Ribbleton railway station
Fulwood, Nottinghamshire, a former civil parish in Skegby Rural District, England
Fulwood, Sheffield, a suburb of Sheffield, England
Fulwood (ward), South Yorkshire, an electoral ward of Sheffield, England
Fulwood, Somerset, a location